Conus riosi is a species of sea snail, a marine gastropod mollusc in the family Conidae, the cone snails, cone shells or cones.

This snail is predatory and venomous and is capable of "stinging" humans.

Description
The length of the shell attains 40 mm.

Distribution
This marine species of cone snail occurs off Martinique.

References

 Monnier E. & Limpalaër L. (2016). Revision of the Dauciconus daucus complex (Gastropoda: Conidae). Description of two new species: Dauciconus jacquescolombi n.sp. from Martinique and Dauciconus massemini n.sp. from French Guyana. Xenophora Taxonomy. 13: 6-37. page(s): 7

External links
 

riosi
Gastropods described in 2016